Tchéky Karyo (born 4 October 1953) is a French actor and musician of Turkish origin. Beginning his career as an actor on stage in classical and contemporary works, he began to work as a character actor in films in the 1980s. He has acted in numerous films by Hollywood and French directors, including Luc Besson. His performance in the 1982 film La Balance, saw him nominated for a César Award for Most Promising Actor.

His film credits include La Femme Nikita, Vincent and Me, Nostradamus, Crying Freeman, Bad Boys, GoldenEye, The Messenger: The Story of Joan of Arc, The Patriot and Kiss of the Dragon. His television roles include Dr. Willy Rozenbaum in the HBO film And the Band Played On, Georges Méliès in the HBO miniseries From the Earth to the Moon, and French detective Julien Baptiste in the BBC crime drama The Missing, and its spin-off series Baptiste (2019-2021).

Early life
He was named Baruch Djaki Karyo at birth in 1953 in Istanbul, Turkey; his mother was Greek Jewish and his father was from a Turkish Jewish family with ancestral roots in Spain (Sephardic Jewish). When he was young, his family moved to Paris, France, where he grew up. He attended the Parisian secondary school Lycée Arago (Paris). As a young man, Karyo studied drama at the Cyrano Theatre, and later became a member of the Daniel Sorano Company, playing many classical roles. The spelling of his name, Djaki, was changed to Tchéky in a form of French transliteration.

Career
Karyo joined the National Theatre of Strasbourg, where he starred in both contemporary and classical plays. He found success in French films beginning in the 1980s, first as a character actor. He later appeared in leading roles in several notable films, such as The Bear, in which he played one of the hunters, and director Luc Besson's La Femme Nikita, in which he played the heroine's spy mentor.

He has appeared in many Hollywood movies, often portraying a French character, in the same fashion as Jean Reno. His movie credits include 1994's Nostradamus in which he plays the famous French prophet, and 1995's Bad Boys opposite Will Smith and Martin Lawrence in which he plays a criminal named Fouchet. He also appeared alongside Jet Li in Kiss of the Dragon (2001) as a corrupt and violent Paris police detective. He has acted in prominent roles in major films set during wartime. Such performances include his acting as a vengeful French officer alongside Mel Gibson in The Patriot (2000), set during the American Revolutionary War, and his role as Jean de Dunois in The Messenger: The Story of Joan of Arc. In the DVD edition of The Patriot, Karyo overdubbed his own lines on the French-language track. He appeared in Martin Sheen's film The Way (2010) as Captain Henri.

In 2014 and 2016 Karyo appeared as Julien Baptiste in the acclaimed BBC One/Starz drama series The Missing. He has received critical praise for his performance. In April 2018, it was confirmed that Karyo would reprise his Baptiste role in a spin-off series titled Baptiste, to be written by Jack and Harry Williams. The first six-episode series began on BBC One on 17 February 2019, with a second series beginning on 18 July 2021.

In 2018, Karyo appeared as Elisha in Mary Magdalene, written by Helen Edmundson and directed by Garth Davis.

Karyo is also a musician and songwriter. In 2006 he released the album Ce lien qui nous unit (English: "The link that binds us"), and released Credo in 2013 on his 60th birthday.

Awards
In 1982, He was nominated for a César Award for Most Promising Actor for his role in La Balance. In 1986, he was awarded the Jean Gabin Prize in recognition of his acting performances.

Selected filmography

Music videos 
 1992 "Born On The Wrong Side Of Town" Jaye Muller(J.) (directed by Jean Baptiste Mondino)
 2005 "L'avenir est à nous" Kool Shen feat Rohff  & Dadoo (directed by J.G Biggs)

References

External links 

Tchéky Karyo at ECI Global Talent Management

1953 births
Living people
20th-century French male actors
21st-century French male actors
French male film actors
Musicians from Istanbul
Male actors from Istanbul
Turkish emigrants to France
Turkish Sephardi Jews
French people of Greek-Jewish descent
French people of Turkish-Jewish descent
French people of Turkish descent
Jewish French male actors
Officiers of the Ordre des Arts et des Lettres